Anand Reddi is a researcher and global health specialist.  He is known for his scholarly work on U.S. Global Health Policy including the President's Emergency Plan for AIDS Relief (PEPFAR).  His basic science research focuses on the molecular mechanisms involved in skin squamous cell cancer tumor initiation and metastasis. In 2005, Reddi was a Fulbright Scholar to South Africa.  He served on the board of directors of the AIDS Healthcare Foundation from 2009–11 and is currently on the board of directors of the Bay Area Global Health Alliance.

Education
Anand Reddi is a graduate of the University of Michigan in Ann Arbor.  He received a Fulbright Fellowship to South Africa assisting the Sinikithemba HIV/AIDS Center at McCord Hospital in Durban, KwaZulu-Natal.  He studied medicine at the University of Colorado School of Medicine.

HIV Research
Reddi's research focuses on the provision of antiretroviral therapy in resource limited settings.  His research in collaboration with Sarah Leeper resulted in one of the first studies that demonstrated that pediatric antiretroviral therapy is effective despite the challenges of a resource limited setting.

Global Health Partnerships
Reddi was the architect of one of the largest HIV Test & Treat projects with The Vatican in Shinyanga, Tanzania.  The project was featured in    
The Daily Telegraph and The Guardian. The project pioneered a decentralized HIV test & treat outreach campaign to find at-risk populations, ultimately testing over 300,000 people and linking to HIV treatment.

The Huffington Post
Reddi is a featured blogger on The Huffington Post writing on global health and U.S. domestic healthcare issues.  In 2010 Reddi published an opinion-editorial article that brought attention to the flat-lining of global AIDS funds by U.S. President Barack Obama's administration.  Within six hours, Ezekiel Emanuel, then senior adviser to President Obama for Health Policy, responded directly to Reddi by writing in the Huffington Post: "Contrary to what Dr. Reddi argues, neither I nor the Obama Administration sees an "either-or" trade-off between PEPFAR and other global health priorities such as improving maternal-child health." Reddi rebutted Emanuel's op-ed with a follow-up post that resulted in the restoration of $366 million for antiretroviral scale-up in Uganda.

AIDS Healthcare Foundation 
In 2011, Reddi resigned from the Board of Directors of the AIDS Healthcare Foundation over a disagreement with AHF's opposition to Pre-exposure Prophylaxis.  Reddi criticized AHF's claims against PrEP in an op-ed in The Huffington Post writing: "AHF’s media campaign against FDA review of PrEP is myopic, blinded by its determination to derail a promising new medication."

Human Capital Contracts
Reddi and Andreas Thyssen, while students at the University of Colorado School of Medicine, were the first to propose the use of human capital contracts to fund medical education in the United States in their article in The Huffington Post entitled: "Healthcare Reform: Solving the Medical Student Debt Crisis Through Human Capital Contracts".  The Reddi-Thyssen plan resulted in legislation by the American Medical Association in support of human capital contracts.  There is also a plan to use human capital contracts in global health.  Thyssen and Reddi published a manuscript in AIDS advocating the use of human capital contracts to increase the number of healthcare workers educated in resource limited settings.  Human capital contracts for global health mechanism is that an investor, such as a donor nation, charitable foundation, or global health initiative, will cover the entire cost of a student's medical training.  In exchange, the student will work for the first 10 years of their medical career in a government or NGO sponsored health clinic in their respective country of medical education.  Their medical license will be contingent on this obligatory national service.  Additionally, a multilateral “binding” agreement between the African country and destination countries (such as Australia, Canada, New Zealand, United Kingdom, and the United States)-brokered by the investor- could prevent migration during the term period.

Major Awards
 Atlantic Dialogues Emerging Leaders. The Atlantic Dialogues recognizes individuals who demonstrate leadership and initiative in their fields and who aim to shape the regional and global agenda in politics, finance, business, civil society, academia and the media. The selection committee recognized Reddi as “catalyzing HIV and viral hepatitis health systems strengthening initiatives as well as innovative health financing for resource limited settings in Africa and Asia.”
 University of Colorado Thomas Jefferson Award. This award, one of the highest honors in the University of Colorado system, recognizes individuals whose life and work promote the Jeffersonian ideals of broad intellectual pursuits and the strong advancement of democratic principles. The award committee citation recognized Reddi as “a leading advocate for translating public health research into policies put into action around the globe. Reddi has worked to protect commitments for the provision of HIV drugs in resource-limited settings.”
 American Medical Association Foundation Leadership Award. The AMA Foundation Leadership Award recognized Reddi's contributions in global health advocacy.
 Edwin E. Osgood Research Award. The American Federation for Medical Research and Society for Clinical Investigation awarded Reddi the Edwin E. Osgood Award for his research on skin squamous cell carcinoma metastasis.
 Fulbright Scholarship to South Africa.
 Eagle Scout, Boy Scouts of America.

Notable Global Health Publications
Reddi A, Thyssen A, Smith D, Lange JH, Akileswaran C.  Human capital contracts for global health: a plan to increase the number of physicians in resource limited settings.  AIDS. 2012 Sep 24;26(15):1979-80.  
 Reddi A.  Hillary Clinton Is Right About HIV/AIDS: Time to Enact a Global Health Service Corps. The Huffington Post, November 10, 2011
 Reddi A. Global HIV/AIDS Treatment Funding at Risk Under Mitt Romney. The Huffington Post, October 17, 2011
 Reddi A.  AIDS funds could be gained in a tax on currency speculation The Washington Post, Page A16, Jan 20, 2011
 Reddi A.  AIDS: Time to Refocus The New York Times, Page D4, Nov 2, 2010
 Reddi A.  AIDS funding must be a priority for the U.S. The Washington Post, Page A14, August 3, 2010
 Reddi A.  United States Global Health Policy: HIV/AIDS Treatment Funding At Risk Under President Obama. The Huffington Post, July 21, 2010
 Leeper SC, Reddi A. United States global health policy: HIV/AIDS, maternal and child health, and The President's Emergency Plan for AIDS Relief (PEPFAR). AIDS. 2010 Sep 10;24(14):2145-9. .
 Reddi A, Leeper SC. Antiretroviral therapy adherence in children: outcomes from Africa. AIDS. 2008 Apr 23;22(7):906-7. .
 Reddi A, Leeper SC, Grobler AC, et al. Preliminary outcomes of a paediatric highly active antiretroviral therapy cohort from KwaZulu-Natal, South Africa. BMC Pediatr. 2007 Mar 17;7:13. ; .

References

Living people
University of Michigan alumni
University of Colorado School of Medicine alumni
HIV/AIDS researchers
Year of birth missing (living people)
Place of birth missing (living people)
Cancer researchers
HuffPost bloggers